Misha Osherovich is an American actor, filmmaker, and activist, known for their role in the film Freaky.

Early life
Osherovich was born in Maryland, U.S., to Russian-Jewish immigrant parents and raised in the Washington, D.C., area.

They attended Island View, a youth residential treatment center in Davis County, Utah, as a teenager, an experience that they have described as abusive and as conversion therapy.

Osherovich graduated with a Bachelor of Fine Arts in Acting from Montclair State University.

Career
Osherovich made their New York stage debut in the off-Broadway production of A Clockwork Orange at New World Stages.

Their television and film credits include roles in the 2019 film The Goldfinch as well as the AMC series NOS4A2. They then co-starred in the horror comedy-film Freaky, released on November 13, 2020. Osherovich wrote and co-produced the short film E.very D.ay. The film addresses Osherovich’s struggle with eating disorders as well as covering the topics of mental health and body image.

As of 2022, Osherovich has a troubled-teen industry drama series in the works with Skylar Landsee and television production company Fremantle. It is based on Osherovich’s experiences and survival story in tough-love programs.

Activism
Osherovich is an advocate for mental healthcare access for the queer community. Partnering with NEDA (National Eating Disorders Association), Osherovich produced the organization's first social media Pride campaign to advocate for awareness about disordered eating and body image struggles within the LGBTQIA+ community.

Osherovich attended a rally held by Paris Hilton in protest of alleged abuse at Provo Canyon School and programs for troubled teens, and spoke out about their own experience with abuse at a Utah troubled teen facility.

The non-binary star opened up more in them about their experience in the troubled teen industry and why they don't want any other queer person to go through the same thing. Osherovich shared their experiences at two facilities, one in Utah and one in Conneticut, and what they experienced in regards to conversion therapy, explaining that queerness and expressions of queerness were considered rebellion for which students would get punished or go to isolation.

Personal life
Osherovich is non-binary and uses they/them pronouns.

Filmography

Film

Television

Stage

References

External links 
 
 

Living people
21st-century American actors
Actors from Maryland
Actors from Washington, D.C.
American non-binary actors
Non-binary activists
American people of Russian-Jewish descent
Montclair State University alumni
LGBT people from Maryland
LGBT people from Washington, D.C.
Year of birth missing (living people)